State Highway 359 (SH 359) is a state highway that runs from Skidmore in southeastern Texas, near Corpus Christi, southwest and west to Laredo at the international border with Mexico.

History
The 359 route designation was first used on May 15, 1946, for a short stretch of highway in Coleman from US 84 west to Commercial Avenue and south along Commercial Avenue to US 67 (now SH 206), with a spur northward along Commercial Avenue to Coleman, but this designation was cancelled and replaced with Texas State Highway Loop 175 on June 17, 1947. The current State Highway 359 was designated on August 24, 1954, along the old US 59 route from Beeville to Laredo. SH 359 covered essentially its present-day route, plus a co-routing with US 181 from Skidmore to Beeville. On January 22, 1958, SH 359 was rerouted on Front Street rather than Main Street in Alice. On August 23, 1960, the dual designation with US 181 from Skidmore to Beeville was removed, which made Skidmore the eastern terminus of SH 359.

Route description
The highway's eastern terminus is the intersection with US 181 at Skidmore.  The route runs southwest through Tynan to an intersection with Interstate 37 at Mathis. The route continues in a southwest direction past Lake Corpus Christi through Sandia, Orange Grove and Alfred until it reaches Alice, where it is briefly co-routed with SH 44.

The route then diverges from SH 44 at San Diego and continues southwest through Benavides and Realitos to a junction with SH 16 at Hebbronville. Here the route takes a more western direction and runs through Bruni and Oilton before its final junction with US 83 at Laredo on the Mexican border. Counties traversed by the route include Bee, San Patricio, Jim Wells, Duval, Jim Hogg and Webb. The highway is paved throughout and multi-lane for portions of the route. With the exception of its western terminus at Laredo, most of the terrain covered by the highway is sparsely populated and rural.

Business routes
SH 359 has one business route.

Mathis business loop

Business State Highway 359-B (Bus. SH 359-B), formerly Loop 198, is a business loop in Mathis. The route was bypassed in 1947 by US 59 and SH 9 and redesignated Loop 198. Loop 198 was redesignated as Business SH 359-B on June 21, 1990.

Major intersections

References

External links

 State Highway 359 at aaroads.com/texas
 Texas official travel map at the Texas Department of Transportation (Adobe Acrobat format, magnification required for legibility)

359
Highways in Laredo, Texas
Alice, Texas
Transportation in Jim Wells County, Texas
U.S. Route 59
Transportation in Webb County, Texas
Transportation in Duval County, Texas
Transportation in Jim Hogg County, Texas
Transportation in San Patricio County, Texas
Transportation in Bee County, Texas
Transportation in Laredo, Texas